Ewart R Carson is a British chartered engineer, system scientist, author, and academic. He is a Professor Emeritus of Systems Science in the School of Science and Technology at City, University of London.

Carson is most known for his research in the field of systems engineering with a focus in the application of systems thinking and modelling to complex social and medical issues, such as health resource management, telemedicine, and other clinical applications. He has authored and edited thirteen books including Dealing with Medical Knowledge, Modelling Methodology in Physiology and Medicine, and Decisions, Computers and Medicines: The Informatics of Pharmacotherapy.

Carson is a Fellow of the Institution of Engineering & Technology, International Academy of Medical and Biological Engineering and the American Institute of Medical & Biological Engineers. He is also a Life Fellow of the Institute of Electrical and Electronics Engineers (US), a Foundation Fellow of the European Alliance for Medical & Biological Engineering and Science, and an Honorary Member of the Royal College of Physicians (London),

Early life and education
Carson enrolled at the University of St Andrews and earned his BSc in Applied Science with majors in Electrical Engineering. He then pursued further education at City, University of London, where he obtained his MSc in Instrument & Control Engineering, and Ph.D. in Systems Science.  His dissertation was titled "Aspects of Dynamics, Control, and Identification of Metabolic Systems". Later in his career, he was awarded a DSc in Measurement & Information in Medicine.

Career
Carson started his professional career as an engineer in the Computer Applications Laboratory at the Philips Electronics Company. Later he moved to academia at what is now City, University of London. He is currently serving as a Professor Emeritus at City, University of London.

Carson was the Director of the Centre for Measurement and Information in Medicine and the Director of the Institute of Health Sciences at City, University of London. He served as an Executive Committee Member at the British Medical Informatics Society and an Expert Reviewer for the European Commission. He chaired the International Measurement Confederation (IMEKO) Technical Committee on Measurement in Medicine and Biology, and the International Federation of Automatic Control (IFAC) Technical Committee on Biomedical Modelling and Control.

Research
Carson's research has focused on the development and evaluation of systems with an emphasis on medicine and healthcare. At the beginning of his academic career, he did research on the development of mathematical models to better understand the dynamics of metabolic processes taking place in the human body. He also conducted research for the development of diabetic advisory systems.

Other major areas of research include health resource management, integrated policy modelling, healthcare technologies, modelling in physiology and medicine, and clinical decision support. He has published more than 300 peer-reviewed articles in journals.

Systems modelling
Carson has developed a range of mathematical models for human metabolic systems including plasma proteins, thyroid hormones and glucose, which helped in enhancing understanding of dynamics and control in quantitative terms. Apart from that he has developed models of the cardiovascular, respiratory, renal and liver organ systems to provide an understanding in quantitative terms of a number of the underlying control processes.

In addition to his research on organ systems, Carson has also worked on investigating the complex dynamics of diabetes, which evolved into the development of modelling approaches designed to assist insulin dosage adjustment for type 1 diabetes. Approaches included differential equation modelling, rule-based expert systems and Bayesian modelling for this purpose. He has also contributed his research expertise in the intensive care unit by collecting and analysing data from monitoring systems and, using machine learning and data mining to extract clinically useful information out of these data to predict future trends.

Telemedicine
Carson uses systems science to develop models that can facilitate adoption in broader areas of science. One particular application area is the field of telemedicine which combines medical knowledge with technology. As a systems scientist, he proposed a systemic framework for the assessment and evaluation of telemedicine and telecare, taking account of a wide range of impacts. He has developed several systems to assist smooth transmission of health status regarding blood glucose levels, blood pressure, sleep patterns etc. of patients with chronic disease from their home to hospital via a small computer device to avoid travel. Based on the data received, patients would receive appropriate clinical advice if required. Using a systemic approach, he developed a telemedicine system for home haemodialysis.

Physiology and medicine
Carson has applied physiological and medical modelling to develop methodologies that can be utilised across a range of domains. In his book Introduction to Modeling in Physiology and Medicine (co-authored with Claudio Cobelli) he described the fundamental principles required for good modelling methodologies to ensure that mathematical models are fit for their particular purpose. He has also provided guidelines on basic approaches to modelling, emphasising non-linear, stochastic and Bayesian formulations including a model of insulin action during a meal/oral glucose tolerance test, a large-scale simulation model of type 1 diabetes and its use in silico clinical trials and drug trials. In his collaborative work on evaluating different models for fluid electrolyte equilibrium, he elucidated that features of all these models, integrated into a single implementation, could provide a system of practical clinical value.

Awards and honors
Career Achievement Award, IEEE Engineering in Medicine and Biology

Bibliography

Selected books
The Mathematical Modeling of Metabolic and Endocrine Systems: Model Formulation, Identification, and Validation (1983) ISBN 978-0471086604
Mathematical Modelling of Dynamic Biological Systems (1985) ISBN 978-0471906889
Dealing with Complexity: an Introduction to the Theory and Application of Systems Science (1993) ISBN 978-0306442995
Dealing with Medical Knowledge: Computers in Clinical Decision Making (1994) ISBN 978-0306448492
Decisions, Computers and Medicines: The Informatics of Pharmacotherapy (2001) ISBN 978-0444500045 
Introduzione alla Modellistica in Fisiologia e Medicina (2012) ISBN 978-8855531580
Modeling Methodology in Physiology and Medicine (2013) ISBN 978-0124115576
Introduction to Modeling in Physiology and Medicine (2019) ISBN 978-0128157565

Selected articles
Andreassen, S., Benn, J. J., Hovorka, R., Olesen, K. G., & Carson, E. R. (1994). A probabilistic approach to glucose prediction and insulin dose adjustment: description of metabolic model and pilot evaluation study. Computer Methods and Programs in Biomedicine, 41(3-4), 153–165.
Carson, E., Cramp, D., Morgan, A., & Roudsari, R. (1997, September). Systems methodology, telemedicine and clinical decision support: their role in the management of chronic disease. In Information Technology Applications in Biomedicine. ITAB'97. Proceedings of the IEEE Engineering in Medicine and Biology Society Region 8 International Conference (pp. 7–10). IEEE.
Cramp, D. G., & Carson, E. R. (2000, November). A model-based framework for public health: a vehicle for maximising the value of telecare?. In Proceedings 2000 IEEE EMBS International Conference on Information Technology Applications in Biomedicine. ITAB-ITIS 2000. Joint Meeting Third IEEE EMBS International Conference on Information Technol (pp. 272–277). IEEE.
Boulos, M. K., Roudsari, A. V., & Carson, E. R. (2001). Health geomatics: an enabling suite of technologies in health and healthcare. Journal of Biomedical Informatics, 34(3), 195–219.
Cramp, D. G., & Carson, E. R. (2009). Systems thinking, complexity and managerial decision-making: an analytical review. Health Services Management Research, 22(2), 71–80.
O’Sullivan, D., Fraccaro, P., Carson, E., & Weller, P. (2014) Decision time for clinical decision support systems. Clinical Medicine, 14, 338–341.

References

Living people
Year of birth missing (living people)